Sailor Moon Sailor Stars, or simply Sailor Stars, is the fifth and final season of Sailor Moon, a Japanese magical girl anime series based on the Sailor Moon manga series by Naoko Takeuchi; the season was directed by Takuya Igarashi and produced by Toei Animation. Like the rest of the Sailor Moon series, it follows the adventures of Usagi Tsukino and her fellow Sailor Guardians. The season is divided into two story arcs, with the first 6 episodes consisting of a self-contained arc exclusive to the anime in which the Sailor Guardians encounter Queen Nehelenia again. The remaining 28 episodes adapt material from the "Stars" arc of the manga, in which the Sailor Guardians meet up with the Sailor Starlights, led by Princess Kakyuu. They discover that Sailor Galaxia, the leader of the "Shadow Galactica" organization and a corrupted Sailor Guardian, plans to increase her powers and rule the Milky Way.

The season began broadcasting on TV Asahi on March 9, 1996 and ended on February 8, 1997 for 34 episodes. It was later released on DVD in six compilations with five episodes, by Toei, from September 26 to November 21, 2005. In May 2014, Viz Media announced that they licensed the series from the start for an uncut release, and also that they plan to release the fifth season on Blu-ray and DVD. On December 14, 2015, Viz Media streamed the first episode of Sailor Moon Sailor Stars, along with the series finale of Sailor Moon SuperS, on Hulu in the United States, followed by a streaming release of the entire show on Tubi TV in Canada on July 15, 2016. The first 17 episodes of Sailor Stars were released on Blu-ray and DVD in a dual-language format on June 18, 2019. The rest were released on November 12, 2019.

Three pieces of theme music were used: one opening theme and two ending themes. The opening theme, titled "Sailor Star Song", is performed by Kae Hanazawa. The ending theme, used for the first 33 episodes, is "Kaze mo Sora mo Kitto..." performed by Alisa Mizuki. The second and final ending theme that was used for the final episode is "Moonlight Densetsu", The Original Sailor Moon Theme, performed by Moon Lips.

Episodes

Release
Bandai released two video games in 1996 to promote this season: Bishoujo Senshi Sailor Moon Sailor Stars for Sega Pico, and Bishoujo Senshi Sailor Moon Sailor Stars: Fuwa Fuwa Panic 2 for Super Nintendo Entertainment System.

Reception

Nehelenia Arc

Stars Arc

Home video releases

English

Blu-ray + DVD combo

Japanese

Blu-ray

Notes

References 

Sailor Stars
1997 Japanese television seasons
Sailor Stars
Milky Way in fiction